Myung Rye-hyun (born 14 April 1926) is a North Korean football player and manager.

Myung was the manager of the North Korea national football team in the 1966 FIFA World Cup, when they became the first Asian team to reach the second round of the World Cup.

References

1926 births
Possibly living people
North Korean footballers
North Korean football managers
North Korea national football team managers
1966 FIFA World Cup managers

Association footballers not categorized by position